This is a list of fellows of the Royal Society elected in its 20th year, 1679.

Fellows 
William Naper  (d. 1683)
Thomas Pigot  (1657–1686)
Thomas Sheridan (1646–1688)
Henry Paman  (1623–1695)
Sir William Waller  (1639–1699)
William Bridgeman  (1646–1699)
Edward Tyson  (1650–1708)
Ezekiel Spanheim Freiherr von (1629–1710)
Giovanni Ambrosio Sarotti  (1679–1714)

References

1679
1679 in science
1679 in England